Teremia Mare is a commune in Timiș County, Romania. It is composed of three villages: Nerău, Teremia Mare (commune seat) and Teremia Mică.

Name

History 
The first recorded mention of Teremia Mare dates from 1256, under the name of Teremteluk. Between 1769 and 1770, the locality was re-established by colonization with Germans (Swabians) from Alsace and Württemberg. It formed a common colony with Teremia Mică, Comloș and Tomnatic. The Catholic church and the school were built in 1770. The Germans called the village Marienfeld or Großteremin. In 1785 it was bought by Cristofor Nakó, and in 1835 it became the property of Ioan Nakó.

In the interwar period it was part of Plasa Comloșu Mare, Timiș-Torontal County and was a German locality, with very few Romanians and Hungarians. After World War II, the Germans began to leave the locality. Gradually, the Romanians take their place. Immediately after the 1989 revolution, the mass exodus of the Germans took place, so that Teremia Mare became a majority Romanian locality.

Demographics 

Teremia Mare had a population of 4,019 inhabitants at the 2011 census, down 3% from the 2002 census. Most inhabitants are Romanians (86.04%), larger minorities being represented by Hungarians (4.4%), Roma (1.64%) and Germans (1%). For 6.15% of the population, ethnicity is unknown. By religion, most inhabitants are Orthodox (77.78%), but there are also minorities of Roman Catholics (6.54%), Pentecostals (4.98%), Baptists (1.82%), Jehovah's Witnesses (1.12%) and Reformed (1.09%). For 6.15% of the population, religious affiliation is unknown.

Economy 

Teremia Mare is a winegrowing community and is known for its high-quality red wine and brandy, the Marienfelder Cognac. Viticulture and winemaking are the most important industries in Teremia Mare. However, growing cereals and vegetables are also of economic importance.

Teremia Mare also became known for the healing thermal water, which is mainly used for rheumatic diseases. The thermal bath was built after a thermal spring was found in 1972 while searching for oil.

Notable people 
 Hansi Schmidt (b. 1942), handball player

References 

Communes in Timiș County
Localities in Romanian Banat